This is a list of places on the Victorian Heritage Register in the City of Manningham in Victoria, Australia. The Victorian Heritage Register is maintained by the Heritage Council of Victoria.

References 

Manningham
City of Manningham